Acromargarita yayanae is a species of sea snail, a marine gastropod mollusk, in the family Mitridae, the miters or miter snails.

References

 Huang S.-I. (2011) Calcimitra, a new genus of deep-water Mitridae (Gastropoda: Mitridae) with the description of five new species from Taiwan and the Philippines. Visaya 3(4): 88-97.
 Huang, S.-I. (2021). A new genus Acromargarita n. gen. and four new Mitridae from the Indo-Pacific Ocean (Mollusca: Gastropoda). Visaya. 5(5): 79-94.

yayanae
Gastropods described in 2011